Stephen Kirwan (a.k.a. Kerovan and O'Kirwan) was an Irish Anglican bishop. He was the Church of Ireland Bishop of Clonfert from 1582 until before 4 November 1601.

Life and career
Kirwan was a member of the tribes of Galway, previously a Roman Catholic educated in Oxford, Paris and Rome. He became an Anglican in the mid-16th century and was the Archdeacon of Annaghdown from 1558 and the first reformed Church of Ireland Bishop of Kilmacduagh from 13 April 1573. Nominated 30 March 1582 for Clonfert, letters patent were issued 24 May 1582 and he was translated to Clonfert the same year.

Kirwan was involved in local government in Connaught, serving as a justice and commissioner for the province from 1580 until his death.

He died before 4 November 1601. Other members of his family included:

 John William Kirwan
 Augustine Kirwan
 Richard Kirwan
 Sir John Kirwan
 Dominick Kirwin

References

 Religion and the Laity in Early Modern Galway, Thomas Connors, Galway:History and Society, 1996, pp. 131–148.
 

People from County Galway
20th-century Anglican bishops in Ireland
Bishops of Clonfert (Church of Ireland)
Converts to Anglicanism from Roman Catholicism
Bishops of Kilmacduagh